Oscar W. Moore Jr. (born March 31, 1938) is an American long-distance runner. He competed in the men's 5000 metres at the 1964 Summer Olympics.

References

1938 births
Living people
Athletes (track and field) at the 1964 Summer Olympics
American male long-distance runners
Olympic track and field athletes of the United States
Place of birth missing (living people)